Univar Solutions Canada is the Canadian subsidiary of Univar Solutions Inc. and one of the largest industrial chemical distributors in Canada.  The company operates six main warehouses across Canada and has corporate offices in Richmond and Calgary.

Univar Solutions Canada is a distributor for many of the world's top chemical manufacturers in a wide variety of industries, including chemical manufacturing, food and beverage, mining, oil and gas production, water treatment, and pharmaceutical.  

Univar Solutions is a member of Responsible Distribution Canada.

External links
 http://www.univarsolutions.com

References

Canadian subsidiaries of foreign companies
Chemical companies of Canada
Companies based in Richmond, British Columbia
Distribution companies of Canada
1950 establishments in British Columbia
Canadian companies established in 1950